Student's Hotel is a 1932 French drama film directed by Viktor Tourjansky and starring Lisette Lanvin, Raymond Galle and Christian Casadesus.

Cast
 Lisette Lanvin as Odette  
 Raymond Galle as Maxime  
 Christian Casadesus as Jacques  
 Yvonne Yma as Madame Sabatier  
 Germaine Roger as Une étudiante 
Sylvette Fillacier as Thérèse  
 Robert Lepers as Imac  
 Henri Vilbert as Étienne  
 Dimitri Dragomir as Tristan 
 Georges Adet 
 Jeanne Boyer  
 Fanny Lacroix 
 Jacqueline Made 
 Bob Maix 
 Odette Olga

References

Bibliography 
 Crisp, Colin. Genre, Myth and Convention in the French Cinema, 1929-1939. Indiana University Press, 2002.

External links 
 

1932 comedy-drama films
French comedy-drama films
1932 films
1930s French-language films
Films directed by Victor Tourjansky
French black-and-white films
1930s French films